Tomopterus seabrai  is a species of beetle in the family Cerambycidae. It was described by Magno in 1995.

References

Tomopterus
Beetles described in 1995